Brian J. Sussman (born April 3, 1956) is an American conservative talk radio host and former television meteorologist in the San Francisco Bay Area who was most recently at San Francisco radio station KSFO.

After graduating from the University of Missouri, Sussman began his professional career as an anchor for KCBJ in Columbia, Missouri in 1978. Sussman became a weather and feature reporter for KOLO-TV in Reno, Nevada in 1980. In 1983 he became the chief meteorologist at KNTV in San Jose, California, and from 1986 to 1988 Sussman presented the weekend weather reports at KDKA-TV in Pittsburgh. It was at KDKA that Sussman gained national prominence with the release of a popular grade school weather curriculum, For Spacious Skies. Sussman's work within For Spacious Skies was eventually honored with an Excellence in Education accolade by the National Education Association.  It was also in Pittsburgh that Sussman's personality was discovered by CBS News in New York, where he became a regular substitute weatherman for "CBS This Morning," a position he held for eight years.  

In late 1988 Sussman became the chief meteorologist for KPIX in San Francisco, a position he held through 2000.  Sussman received eight Mark Twain, "Best Weathercast" trophies by the Associated Press in California, and eight "Best Weathercast" awards from the Radio-TV News Directors Association of Northern California.   

After leaving KPIX, Sussman switched to conservative talk radio. From 2002 to 2010, Sussman hosted an evening talk show on KSFO before moving to the station's morning drive show, which he would host from 2010 to 2019. In addition, Sussman has written two nationally best-selling books critical of the scientific consensus on climate change, Climategate and Eco-Tyranny.

Personal background 
Sussman was born in 1956 in East Los Angeles, California. His family moved to Golden, Colorado when he was in grade school, and to Northbrook, Illinois when for his high school years. He graduated from Glenbrook High School in 1974. Sussman graduated from the University of Missouri in 1978 with a B.S. in radio, television, and film. Sussman grew up in a Jewish family and became a Messianic follower of Jesus while in college. He married Sue Rittenhouse in 1978. They have four children, three of whom were adopted. He is an avid drummer who has been playing in gigging local bands for many years.

Television career 
Sussman began his television career in 1977 as a news anchor for Columbia, Missouri television station KCBJ. In 1980, Sussman joined KOLO-TV of Reno, Nevada as a weather and feature reporter. Sussman had an exclusive interview with the Reverend Billy Graham when Graham visited Reno for his 270th crusade in 1980. "It was life changing," says Sussman. "He encouraged me to use my media platform to tell others that Jesus is 'the way, truth, and life.'" In 1983, Sussman became weather reporter with KNTV of San Jose, California. While working for KNTV, Sussman attended graduate meteorology courses at San Jose State University. Sussman was part of an evening newscast at KNTV that surprised stations in San Francisco when it won a local Emmy Award for best newscast in 1985.

In 1987, Sussman moved to Pittsburgh to join KDKA-TV, then a Group W station, as a meteorologist. While at KDKA, Sussman volunteered at local schools to teach children meteorological concepts, on behalf of nonprofit organisation For Spacious Skies. Sussman also won the Radio-Television News Directors Association (RTNDA) award for best local weathercast in 1987.

From 1988 to 1995, Sussman was under contract as substitute weather anchor for CBS This Morning. Sussman was the evening news meteorologist with Group W's San Francisco TV station KPIX from 1989 to 2000, where he won RTNDA best local weathercast awards from 1990 to 1995 and 1997 to 1999. At KPIX, Sussman also hosted a weekly five-minute segment called "Brian's Kids" that profiled foster children. "Brian's Kids" led to the adoption of nearly 400 children, including one by Sussman. Expressing a desire to spend evenings with his family, Sussman left KPIX on December 22, 2000, shortly after the retirement of longtime anchor and local personality Dave McElhatton; Sussman joined Heidrick & Struggles as a media recruiter in January 2001.

Radio and podcasting career 
While attending the University of Missouri, Sussman hosted a jazz music show on the university's student radio station KCOU. During his senior year at Missouri in 1977–78, Sussman hosted an overnight Sunday talk show on local radio station KFRU. In the summer 1977, Sussman did vacation relief fill-in hosting for KSCO radio in Santa Cruz, California  

Sussman began his major market radio career as a guest host on San Francisco Christian radio station KFAX on September 11, 2001, after the regular host was unable to work due to a delayed flight. Shortly after a couple guest stints as a host on San Francisco conservative talk station KSFO, Sussman was hired to take over the evening drive time in 2003.

In 2006, citing copyright law, KSFO sent cease and desist letters to a blogger with the online name "Spocko" who posted audio clips of Sussman and other KSFO hosts online to convince advertisers to withdraw from KSFO. Sussman stated emphatically that his comments were comedic attempts that were grossly taken out of context, and sincerely apologized on his January 12, 2007 show. KSFO lost advertising from Bank of America and MasterCard.

Following the retirement of Lee Rodgers, Sussman moved from evenings to morning drive full-time on KSFO on February 19, 2010; since coming to KSFO Sussman previously hosted the morning show each Monday. SF Weekly criticized Sussman in April 2011 for promoting Barack Obama citizenship conspiracy theories despite the release of Obama's long-form birth certificate, which Sussman called "doctored."

From 2012 to 2013, Melanie Morgan was Sussman's co-host. In 2018, Sussman won the Don Sherwood Award from the Bay Area Radio Hall of Fame for being the Bay Area's most popular radio personality of the year.

In addition to the KSFO show, Sussman was a regular guest host on The Savage Nation and The Mark Levin Show.

On Friday, December 13, 2019, Sussman told his audience, "This is not a Friday the Thirteenth joke. I love this audience. I love my awesome producer, Sheri, and my trusty sidekick, Katie, It's been a great ride but my body and mind just can't continue starting work each day at three in the morning." Sussman officially retired on January 15, 2020.

In 2020, Sussman launched two podcasts on his website: Hidden Headlines, which discusses news and culture with a promotion of "faith, family and freedom," and Another Chance, where Sussman interviews people who "have personally experienced a divine reboot." His Instagram feed is @briansussmanshow.

Writing career 
Sussman maintains a blog on his website. He has also written opinion articles for WorldNetDaily.

Climategate: A Veteran Meteorologist Exposes the Global Warming Scam, which was published on Earth Day, April 22, 2010.  In the book, Sussman argues Marxist activists in the 1960s ginned up ecological problems in the United States, namely the Santa Barbara oil spill and the Cuyahoga River fire in Cleveland in 1969 as rallying points against free market capitalism and constitutional republicanism. The result was the creation of Earth Day and the eventual mainstreaming of radical environmentalism. After premiering the book on Sean Hannity's Fox television program on April 14, 2010, the day before it was to be released, book sales were brisk and Climategate spent its first month in the top-50 of all books sold on Amazon.

Sussman has also written Eco-Tyranny: How the Left's Green Agenda will Dismantle America, published by WND Books in 2012. Here, Sussman continues his theme of environmental Marxism by exploring the roots of the movement beginning with a colleague of Karl Marx, Justus Von Leibig, who attacked capitalism on environmental standards, followed by Sir Edwin Ray Lankester, a  friend of Marx, who described humans as "the insurgent sons of Nature," to Lankester's star pupil, Arthur Tansley, who coined the term "ecosystem," to Vladimir Lenin, who engrossed himself in the works of Marx and, a party chair of communist Russian, declared all forests, waters, and minerals to be property of the state.

Bibliography

References

External links 
 Official Website of Brian Sussman

American talk radio hosts
American political commentators
Radio personalities from San Francisco
Television anchors from San Francisco
1956 births
Living people
People from San Carlos, California
People from Santa Clara County, California
People from East Los Angeles, California
People from Northbrook, Illinois
University of Missouri alumni
San Jose State University alumni
Television personalities from Pittsburgh
Radio personalities from Missouri
People from Reno, Nevada